Tyrfing was a magic sword in Norse mythology.

Tyrfing or Tirfing may refer to:

 Thyrfing, a viking metal band from Sweden
 Tirfing, an opera by Swedish composer Wilhelm Stenhammar
 , several ships of the Swedish Navy
 SK Tirfing, a sports club in Harnäs, Sweden

See also 
 Tyrfing Cycle, a collection of Norse legends